The National Foundation for Educational Research (NFER) is an educational research organisation which gathers evidence and research to inform educational policy and school services. The foundation is not an examination board, however they provide paper-based end of year assessments (NFER tests) for primary schools in England and Wales.

Originally founded in 1946 as the centre for educational research and development in England and Wales, the NFER's head office is located at 'The Mere' in Slough, Berkshire, England. The foundation also has an office in York.

The foundation's work includes educational research, evaluation of education and training programmes,  and the development of assessments and specialist information services. The NFER also sponsors the CERUKplus (Current Educational Research in the UK) database, which contains details of current or on-going research in education and related disciplines, and hosts the EURYDICE Unit for England, Wales and Northern Ireland, in EURYDICE, the information network on education in Europe (www.nfer.ac.uk/eurydice).

The NFER founded nferNelson, which they sold to the Granada Learning/GL assessments for the 11+ and other common entrance exams Group in 2000.

Departments 
There are six centres within the research department that carry out a variety of independent work;
 Centre for Assessment
 Centre for Policy and Practice: Programmes
 Centre for Policy and Practice: Development
 Centre for Research Planning and Knowledge Management
 Centre for International Education
 Centre for Statistics

External links
 NFER website Official Website
 NFER Publications

1946 establishments in England
Educational charities based in the United Kingdom
Educational research
Organizations established in 1946
Organisations based in Slough
Education in England
Education in Wales

References